Joseph Garland may refer to:

 Joe Garland (1903–1977), American jazz saxophonist, composer and arranger
 Joseph Garland (mayor) (1830–1914), American doctor and mayor of Gloucester, Massachusetts
 Joseph E. Garland, American historian and journalist 
 Joseph Garland (pediatrician) (1893–1973), American pediatrician and editor-in-chief of The New England Journal of Medicine

See also
 George Joseph Garland (1856–1950), member of the New Zealand Legislative Council